Rubin is both a surname and a given name.

Rubin may also refer to:

Places
 Al-Nabi Rubin, Acre, a Palestinian village
 Vera C. Rubin Observatory, Chile, formerly the Large Synoptic Survey Telescope

Organizations
 Rubin (company), a wine-making company in Serbia
 Rubin Design Bureau, a Russian submarine designer center
 FC Rubin Kazan, a Russian football club, based in the city of Kazan (Tatarstan republic)

Other uses
 Benedict–Webb–Rubin equation
 Soyuz 1, a Soviet spaceflight that used the call sign "Rubin"
 Vera Rubin Early Career Prize (Rubin Prize), an award given by the American Astronomical Society

See also

 Ruben
 Reuben (disambiguation)
 Schmidt–Rubin, a series of Swiss Army service rifles